Mohammad-Mehdi Abdekhodaei is an Iranian conservative activist.

Son of Sheikh Gholamhosein Mojtahed-e Tabrizi, he had a lower-middle-class bazaari background and was a minor attendant in a small hardware store. On 13 February 1952, when he was a 15-year-old member of the Fada'iyan-e Islam, he attempted to assassinate Hossein Fatemi who was delivering a speech at the grave of journalist Mohammad Masud who had been assassinated in 1948. Fatemi survived the shooting. Abdekhodaei was tried as a juvenile and imprisoned for twenty months.

He revived the Fada'iyan-e Islam after the Iranian Revolution, though the organization is not a significant actor.

References

External links

Secretaries-General of political parties in Iran
Iranian assassins
Fada'iyan-e Islam members
Living people

1930s births

Year of birth uncertain